This is a list of dental organizations in the United States.

National
 Academy for Sports Dentistry 
 Academy of General Dentistry 
 Academy of Operative Dentistry
 Academy of Interdisciplinary Dentofacial Therapy 
 Academy of Laser Dentistry 
 Academy of Osseointegration
 Alpha Omega fraternity 
 American Academy of Cosmetic Dentistry 
 American Academy of Craniofacial Pain
 American Academy of Dental Hygiene
 American Academy of Dental Practice Administration 
 American Academy of Esthetic Dentistry 
 American Academy of Facial Esthetics
 American Academy of Fixed Prosthodontics 
 American Academy of Implant Dentistry 
 American Academy of Implant Prosthodontics 
 American Academy of Maxillofacial Prosthetics 
 American Academy of Orofacial Pain 
 American Academy of Pediatric Dentistry 
 American Academy of Periodontology 
 American Academy of Restorative Dentistry 
 American Academy for Oral Systemic Health 
 American Association for Dental Research 
 American Association of Endodontists 
 American Association of Oral and Maxillofacial Surgeons 
 American Association of Oral Biologists 
 American Association of Orthodontists 
 American Association of Public Health Dentistry
 American Board of Forensic Odontology 
 American Cleft Palate-Craniofacial Association 
 American College of Dentists 
 American College of Forensic Examiners 
 American College of Prosthodontics 
 American Dental Assistants Association
 American Dental Association
 American Dental Education Association
 American Dental Hygienists' Association 
 American Dental Society of Anesthesiology 
 American Equilibration Society
 American Orthodontic Society
 American Society for Dental Aesthetics 
 American Society of Dental Anesthesiologists
 American Society of Forensic Odontology 
 American Society for Geriatric Dentistry 
 American Student Dental Association
 American Veterinary Dental Society
 Arizona State University Pre-Dental Organization 
 Association of Managed Care Providers 
 Certified Dentists Internationale
 Charles Tweed Foundation
 Committee on Dental Auxiliaries 
 Dental Anthropology Association 
 Dental Assisting National Board 
 Federation of Special Care Dentistry Association
 Hispanic Dental Association
 Journal of Esthetic and Restorative Dentistry
 National Institute of Dental and Craniofacial Research
 Society of American Indian Dentists
 United States Navy Dental Corps

States
 California Society of Pediatric Dentists 
 California Society of Pediatric Dentists 
 California Society of Periodontists 
 Colegio de Cirujanos Dentistas de Puerto Rico
 Connecticut State Dental Association
 Florida Dental Association
 Kansas Dental Board
 Massachusetts Dental Society
 New York State Dental Association
 New York State Academy of General Dentistry
 New York State Dental Foundation
 Ohio Dental Association
 Texas State Board of Dental Examiners

Others
 Christian Medical and Dental Associations
 Delta Sigma Delta
 Psi Omega
 United States Navy Dental Corps

References

Dental organizations in the United States